Baron Fairhaven, of Anglesey Abbey in the County of Cambridge, is a title in the Peerage of the United Kingdom. It was created in 1961 for Urban Huttleston Broughton, 1st Baron Fairhaven, with remainder to his younger brother, Henry Rogers Broughton (1900–1973). He had already been created Baron Fairhaven, of Lode in the County of Cambridge, in 1929, with remainder to the heirs male of his body.

The first Baron Fairhaven was the eldest son of Urban Hanlon Broughton, a civil engineer, businessman and Conservative Member of Parliament who died in January 1929 before his intended elevation to the peerage as Baron Fairhaven. At the same time, Lord Fairhaven's mother, Cara Leland Broughton, daughter of the American industrialist Henry Huttleston Rogers, was granted Royal warrant to the style and title as if her husband had been created Baron Fairhaven.

As the first Baron Fairhaven had no male heirs, in 1961 he was created Baron Fairhaven, of Anglesey Abbey in the County of Cambridge, with special remainder to his younger brother, Henry. On his death in 1966, the barony of 1929 became extinct and he was succeeded in the barony of 1961 by his brother, Henry, who became the second Baron.  the title is held by the latter's only son, the third Baron, who succeeded in 1973.

The title is unusual in referring to a town in the United States, Fairhaven in Massachusetts, which was the birthplace of the first Baron.

The family seat is Anglesey Abbey, near Lode, Cambridgeshire.

Barons Fairhaven (1929; First creation)
Urban Huttleston Broughton, 1st Baron Fairhaven (1896–1966)

Barons Fairhaven (1961; Second creation)
Urban Huttleston Broughton, 1st Baron Fairhaven (1896–1966)
Henry Rogers Broughton, 2nd Baron Fairhaven (1900–1973)
Ailwyn Henry George Broughton, 3rd Baron Fairhaven (b. 1936)

The heir apparent is the present holder's son, the Hon. James Henry Ailwyn Broughton (b. 1963)
The next in line to the heir apparent is his son, George Ailwyn James Broughton (b. 1997)

Line of Succession

 Urban Hanlon Broughton (1857—1929)
  Urban Huttleston Rogers Broughton, 1st Baron Fairhaven (1896—1966)
  Henry Rogers Broughton, 2nd Baron Fairhaven (1900—1973)
  Ailwyn Henry George Broughton, 3rd Baron Fairhaven (born 1936)
 (1) Major Hon. James Henry Ailwyn Broughton (b. 1963)
 (2) George Ailwyn James Broughton (b. 1997)
 (3) Hon. Charles Leander Broughton (b. 1973)
 (4) Hon. Henry Robert Broughton (b. 1978)

References

Kidd, Charles, Williamson, David (editors). Debrett's Peerage and Baronetage (1990 edition). New York: St Martin's Press, 1990.

Baronies in the Peerage of the United Kingdom
Extinct baronies in the Peerage of the United Kingdom
Noble titles created in 1929
Noble titles created in 1961
Peerages created with special remainders